The Walter Burke Institute for Theoretical Physics is a research center at the California Institute of Technology focused on high-energy physics, condensed matter physics, astrophysics, general relativity, and cosmology. It was founded in 2014.

History 
The Institute was founded in 2014 with grants from the Sherman Fairchild Foundation, the Gordon and Betty Moore Foundation, and funding from the California Institute of Technology itself. It had an initial  endowment of over $70 million, a significant amount, particularly when placed in the context of Department of Energy funding for high-energy physics. It is named after Walter Burke, a trustee of Caltech and president of the Sherman Fairchild Foundation. Its inaugural director is Hirosi Ooguri, a string theorist.

References 

Theoretical physics institutes
Physics institutes
California Institute of Technology